Trosper Lake is a lake in the U.S. state of Washington.

Trosper Lake was named after John Trosper, a pioneer citizen.

References

Lakes of Thurston County, Washington